Chorisoneura texensis, the small Texas cockroach,  is a small species of cockroach (family Ectobiidae) native to the Southeastern United States.

Gallery

References

 

Cockroaches
Insects described in 1893